Thomas Adams, FRCO (1857-1918) was a noted English composer and was organist at the parish church of St Alban's Church, Holborn in London from 1888 until his death. A prolific composer of anthems, oratorios and organ music. His published work (mainly by Novello) includes the oratorio The Story of Calvary and The Holy Child.

References

External links 
 

1857 births
1918 deaths
19th-century English musicians
19th-century British male musicians
British male organists
Composers for pipe organ
English classical organists
English composers
Male classical organists